Böðvar Böðvarsson (born 9 April 1995) is an Icelandic football defender who plays for Trelleborg.

Club career
On 5 February 2018, Böðvarsson signed a three and a half year contract with Jagiellonia Białystok.

He signed for Trelleborg in January 2022 after a year with Helsingborg.

International career
Böðvar has been involved with the U-19 and U-21 teams, and made his senior team debut against China at the 2017 China Cup.

References

External links

1995 births
People from Hafnarfjörður
Living people
Icelandic footballers
Association football defenders
Iceland youth international footballers
Iceland international footballers
Fimleikafélag Hafnarfjarðar players
FC Midtjylland players
Jagiellonia Białystok players
Helsingborgs IF players
Trelleborgs FF players
Úrvalsdeild karla (football) players
Ekstraklasa players
Superettan players
Icelandic expatriate footballers
Expatriate men's footballers in Denmark
Icelandic expatriate sportspeople in Denmark
Expatriate footballers in Poland
Icelandic expatriate sportspeople in Poland
Expatriate footballers in Sweden
Icelandic expatriate sportspeople in Sweden